is a Japanese badminton player who specializes in doubles.

Yamashita, together with his partner Naru Shinoya, won the mixed doubles bronze medal at the 2021 World Championships after losing in the semifinals to compatriots Yuta Watanabe and Arisa Higashino, 13–21, 8–21.

Achievements

BWF World Championships 
Mixed doubles

BWF World Tour (1 runner-up) 
The BWF World Tour, which was announced on 19 March 2017 and implemented in 2018, is a series of elite badminton tournaments sanctioned by the Badminton World Federation (BWF). The BWF World Tour is divided into levels of World Tour Finals, Super 1000, Super 750, Super 500, Super 300 (part of the HSBC World Tour), and the BWF Tour Super 100.

Mixed doubles

BWF International (1 title) 
Men's doubles

  BWF International Challenge tournament
  BWF International Series tournament
  BWF Future Series tournament

BWF Junior International (1 title, 1 runner-up) 
Boys' doubles

  BWF Junior International Grand Prix tournament
  BWF Junior International Challenge tournament
  BWF Junior International Series tournament
  BWF Junior Future Series tournament

References

External links 
 

1998 births
Living people
Sportspeople from Okayama Prefecture
Japanese male badminton players
21st-century Japanese people